Anton Santesson (born April 29, 1994) is a Swedish ice hockey defenceman. He is currently playing with Rögle BK of the Swedish Hockey League (SHL).

Santesson made his Elitserien (now the SHL) debut playing with Rögle BK during the 2012–13 Elitserien season.

References

External links

1994 births
Living people
Swedish ice hockey defencemen
Rögle BK players
People from Ängelholm Municipality